OCI Company Ltd. (OCI) is a chemical company founded in 1959, with its head office in Seoul, South Korea. The company's name is an initialism of its former corporate name, Oriental Chemical Industries.

The main products of OCI include polycrystalline silicon, hydrogen peroxide, fumed silica, coal tar pitch, BTX, and other chemical related materials.

History
OCI was founded by Lee Hoi-rim as Oriental Chemical Industries in 1959. OCI was the first company to establish a soda ash factory and boosted the alkali industry in South Korea. In 2001, Oriental Chemical Industries merged with Korea Steel Chemical and changed its name to DC Chemical. However, after eight years, DC Chemical was reverted to OCI with the acronym of its original name.

References

External links
 

Chaebol
Companies based in Seoul
Chemical companies established in 1959
South Korean brands
South Korean companies established in 1959
Companies listed on the Korea Exchange